

See also
 List of minerals

References

Geology-related lists
Physics-related lists